Frazier Healthcare Partners is a leading healthcare private equity and venture capital firm based in Seattle, Washington with offices in Menlo Park, California that invests across the U.S., Canada and Europe. The firm specializes in leveraged buyouts, growth equity and venture capital financing.

Background 
Frazier Healthcare Partners was founded by Alan D. Frazier in 1991.  With over $7.1 billion total capital raised, the firm has invested in over 200 companies and currently manages a portfolio of approximately 40 companies across healthcare services and life sciences sectors.

The firm’s Growth Buyout team invests in healthcare and pharmaceutical services, medical products and related sectors. The Life Sciences team invests in therapeutics and related areas that are addressing unmet medical needs through innovation.

In 2021, the investment firm closed its 10th dedicated healthcare fund focused on middle market companies, which was oversubscribed and hit its hard cap of $1.4 billion in total capital commitments.

References

External links 
 

Financial services companies established in 1991
Private equity firms of the United States
American companies established in 1991